The Bradys is an American comedy-drama television series that aired on CBS from February 9 to March 9, 1990. The series is a sequel and continuation of the original 1969–1974 sitcom The Brady Bunch, focusing on its main characters as adults, and was the second such continuation after the 1981 sitcom The Brady Brides.

Airing on Friday nights, The Bradys failed in the ratings against Full House and Family Matters as part of the TGIF lineup on ABC and was canceled after one month; the last of the six episodes produced aired on March 9, 1990. In its short run, the show went through three different theme songs based on that of The Brady Bunch, the last featuring revised lyrics sung by Florence Henderson.

Cast
 Robert Reed as Mike Brady
 Florence Henderson as Carol Brady
 Ann B. Davis as Alice Nelson-Franklin
 Barry Williams as Dr. Greg Brady
 Leah Ayres as Marcia Brady-Logan
 Christopher Knight as Peter Brady
 Eve Plumb as Jan Brady-Covington
 Mike Lookinland as Bobby Brady
 Susan Olsen as Cindy Brady
 Jerry Houser as Wally Logan, Marcia's husband
 Ron Kuhlman as Philip Covington III, Jan's husband
 Caryn Richman as Nora Brady, Greg's wife
 Martha Quinn as Tracy Wagner-Brady, Bobby's wife
 Ken Michelman as Gary Greenberg, Cindy's radio station manager and love interest
 Jonathan Taylor Thomas as Kevin Brady, Greg's and Nora's son
 Michael Melby as Mickey Logan, Marcia's and Wally's son
 Jaclyn Bernstein as Jessica Logan, Marcia's and Wally's daughter
 Valerie Ick as Patty Covington, Jan's and Philip's adopted daughter from Korea

Influence and casting
In 1988, CBS commissioned a Brady Bunch reunion telefilm for its Christmas season programming. A Very Brady Christmas premiered on December 18 and drew a 25.1 rating and 39 share, very high ratings for a television film at the time. The success of the film convinced series creator Sherwood Schwartz that a new Brady family TV series could be a hit, and work began on the show in December 1989. CBS re-aired A Very Brady Christmas on December 22, 1989, using it as a promotional tool for the upcoming new show.

Robert Reed,  Florence Henderson, Ann B. Davis, Barry Williams, Christopher Knight, Eve Plumb, Mike Lookinland and Susan Olsen all returned in their original roles from The Brady Bunch. Jerry Houser and Ron Kuhlman, also, reprised their roles from The Brady Brides. While Maureen McCormick had appeared in A Very Brady Christmas, she declined to return for this series, and Leah Ayres assumed the role of Marcia.

Style
The Bradys involved more dramatic storytelling than that which viewers had seen in the previous Brady series. Unlike the original 30-minute sitcom, The Bradys was an hour long and featured far more serious plot lines. Among them:

 Family patriarch Mike begins a political career.
 Greg is now an obstetrician, is married to a nurse name Nora, and have a son together, named Kevin (played by Jonathan Taylor Thomas).
 Bobby's budding auto-racing career ends abruptly in the first episode after an accident leaves him a paraplegic. As he recovers, he marries his college girlfriend.
 Peter breaks up with his fiancée, to whom he became engaged in A Very Brady Christmas, and begins dating the abusive daughter of Mike's political rival.
 Jan and Philip, unable to conceive children of their own, adopt a Korean girl named Patty.
 Marcia, a stay-at-home mother, battles alcoholism while Wally loses yet another in a series of jobs, the latest being as Mike's campaign manager. Wally and Marcia, who have been forced to move in with Mike and Carol along with their two children, open a catering business to support their family.
 Radio host Cindy begins a romance with her boss, a widower more than ten years her senior who has two children.

Despite the more dramatic tone, the show did include a laugh track.

An unproduced script had Mike Brady die in a helicopter accident when he went to check out a progress at a fire break and the chopper hit a downdraft due to a wind shear caused by a flame. The script also called for Carol to sing at the funeral. In addition, Jan would have finally gotten pregnant, Gary would have proposed to Cindy and Peter would have taken over Mike's position as city councilman and the Mobile Trauma Unit that he helped build would have been named after Mike.

Episodes

Notes
 "Start Your Engines" and "Here We Grow Again" were later repackaged as a two-hour movie titled The Brady 500.
 "A Moving Experience" and "Hat in the Ring" were later repackaged as a two-hour movie titled The Bradys on the Move.
 "Bottom's Up" and "The Party Girls" were later repackaged as a two-hour movie titled Big Kids, Big Problems.

Home media
In April 2007, the two-hour pilot episode, The Brady 500 (a.k.a. "Start Your Engines/Here We Grow Again"), was released as a bonus feature on The Brady Bunch: The Complete Series 21-disc DVD box set issued by CBS Home Entertainment and Paramount Home Entertainment.

In 2019, the series was released on DVD as a part of The Brady-est Brady Bunch TV & Movie Collection.

References

External links
 
 Brady World – episode guide
 History of The Brady Bunch by Wendy Winans

The Brady Bunch
1990 American television series debuts
1990 American television series endings
1990s American comedy-drama television series
CBS original programming
English-language television shows
Fictional families
American sequel television series
Television series about families
Television series by CBS Studios
Television series created by Sherwood Schwartz
Television shows set in Los Angeles